Spilosoma heterogenea is a moth in the family Erebidae. It was described by Max Bartel in 1903. It is found in Angola.

References

Endemic fauna of Angola
Moths described in 1903
heterogenea